NGC 4041 is the New General Catalogue identifier for a spiral galaxy in the northern circumpolar constellation of Ursa Major. It is located an estimated 70 million light years from the Sun. The morphological classification of SA(rs)bc indicates this is a spiral galaxy the lacks a bar; the 'rs' means it has a weakly-formed ring structure, and the 'bc' indicates the spiral arms are moderately to loosely wound.

The galaxy is inclined by around 20° to the line of sight from the Earth. The star formation rate is much higher in the central region, which may be the result of recent merger with a dwarf galaxy within the last 100 million years.

This galaxy has no detected activity in the nuclear region. There is a rotating nuclear disk of high brightness at the core that is consistent with the presence of a compact mass of  . Most likely this is a supermassive black hole (SMBH).

On July 29, 1994, the type IIp supernova designated SN 1994W was discovered in this galaxy by Giancarlo Cortini and Mirko Villi. The event reached peak visual magnitude on August 13, and declined thereafter. It was located about 19 arc seconds to the northwest of the nucleus. This supernova was unusual for the exceptionally low quantity of nickel-56 released—indeed, it was the lowest inferred amount measured for any type II supernova as of that date. Based upon a possible detection of X-ray emission from the remnant, this may be a high-luminosity type IIn supernova.

NGC 4041 is a member of the LGG 266 galaxy group, along with NGC 4036, IC 758, UGC 7009, and UGC 7019.

References

External links 
 

Unbarred spiral galaxies
Ursa Major (constellation)
4041
7014
037999